The 2 July 1871 by-elections were held in France in 114 constituencies to elect seats left vacant since the general election in February 1871 because, as was permitted at the time, some deputies had been elected in several constituencies.

184 other by-elections were held between this election and the 1876 election.

Results

Parliamentary Groups

Sources 
Roi et President

1871
1871 elections in Europe
Legislative elections
July 1871 events